Dr. Sketchy's Anti-Art School is both a burlesque cabaret and life drawing event originating in Williamsburg, Brooklyn, at the Lucky Cat.  Dr. Sketchy's was founded in New York City in 2005, by illustrator and former artist's model Molly Crabapple and illustrator A.V. Phibes who later left to attend to her design studio.

Described as a cross between an old-fashioned life-drawing session and a new-wave cabaret, in a typical sketching session, artists will drink alcohol, sketch burlesque models, and play art games in a bar or venue like an art museum.

Crabapple will often travel around the world visiting different Dr. Sketchy's. As of 2009 there are branches of Dr. Sketchy's Anti-Art School all over the world.
  
The Official Dr. Sketchy's Rainy Day Colouring Book, by Molly Crabapple and John Leavitt, was released by Sepulculture Books in December 2006, and is in its second printing.  Other projects include a 2008 pin-up calendar, a series of YouTube comedy shorts, a national tour, an art show, and a 21-show run at the Edinburgh Festival Fringe.

Artist Mark Reusch, aka Mister Reusch, designed premiere poster for the Bostom branch in 2007.

In 2010, a short documentary by Peter Bolte was made about Dr. Sketchy.

Despite conservatism in continents such as Asia, Dr. Sketchy's appears to be widely accepted in Tokyo, Singapore and the Philippines.  The Singapore branch is headlined by Becca D'Bus.  The Philippine branch is one of Crabapple's favorite new branches.

Dr. Sketchy Branches
Dr Sketchy started in NYC, and now has branches around the world. As of 2019 there are over 100 branches.

•UNITED STATES

Dr. Sketchy's Akron

Dr. Sketchy's Asbury Park

Dr. Sketchy's Asheville

Dr. Sketchy's Austin

Dr. Sketchy's Baltimore

Dr. Sketchy's Boston

Dr. Sketchy's Boulder City NV

Dr. Sketchy's Burlington (VT)

Dr. Sketchy's Cape Cod

Dr. Sketchy's Charleston

Dr. Sketchy's Columbia

Dr. Sketchy's Dayton

Dr. Sketchy's Denver

Dr. Sketchy's Fort Worth

Dr. Sketchy's Grand Rapids

Dr. Sketchy's Houston

Dr. Sketchy's Indianapolis

Dr. Sketchy's Las Vegas

Dr. Sketchy's Los Angeles

Dr. Sketchy's Middle Georgia

Dr. Sketchy's Nashville

Dr. Sketchy's New Orleans

Dr. Sketchy's New York

Dr. Sketchy's North Jersey

Dr. Sketchy's Oklahoma City

Dr. Sketchy's PDX (Portland, Oregon)

Dr. Sketchy's Philadelphia

Dr. Sketchy's Phoenix

Dr. Sketchy's Pittsburgh

Dr. Sketchy's Raleigh

Dr. Sketchy's Richmond

Dr. Sketchy's Sacramento

Dr. Sketchy's Saint Louis

Dr. Sketchy's San Diego

Dr. Sketchy's San Francisco

Dr. Sketchy's Seattle

Dr. Sketchy's Twin Cities

Dr. Sketchy's Washington DC

Dr. Sketchy's York, PA

Western MA

•CANADA

Dr. Sketchy's Kamloops

Dr. Sketchy's Montreal

Dr. Sketchy's Toronto

Dr. Sketchy's Vancouver

•SOUTH AMERICA

Dr. Sketchy's Lima

•UNITED KINGDOM

Dr. Sketchy's Birmingham

Dr. Sketchy's Bristol

Dr. Sketchy's Cambridge

Dr. Sketchy's Cardiff

Dr. Sketchy's Derry

Dr. Sketchy's Edinburgh

Dr. Sketchy's Glasgow

Dr. Sketchy's Leeds

Dr. Sketchy's London

Dr. Sketchy's Manchester

Dr. Sketchy's Norwich

Dr. Sketchy's Nottingham

Dr. Sketchy's Salisbury

Dr. Sketchy's York

•EUROPE

Dr. Sketchy's Berlin

Dr. Sketchy's Bratislava

Dr. Sketchy's Brussels

Dr. Sketchy's Cologne

Dr. Sketchy's Finland

Dr. Sketchy's Hamburg

Dr. Sketchy's Hanover

Dr. Sketchy's Ireland

Dr. Sketchy's Lyon

Dr. Sketchy's Oslo

Dr. Sketchy's Paris

Dr. Sketchy's Rome

•ASIA

Dr. Sketchy's Philippines

Dr. Sketchy's Tokyo

Dr. Sketchy's Tottori

•AUSTRALIA

Dr. Sketchy's Brisbane

Dr. Sketchy's Darwin

Dr. Sketchy's Ipswich

Dr. Sketchy's Melbourne

Dr. Sketchy's Newcastle

Dr. Sketchy's Perth

Dr. Sketchy's Sydney

•NEW ZEALAND

Dr. Sketchy's Auckland

Dr. Sketchy's Christchurch

•ANTARCTICA

Dr. Sketchy's Antarctica

References

External links
Molly Crabapple's Village Voice Interview
Dr. Sketchy's Anti-Art School film entry on imdb.com

Education in New York (state)
Burlesque